Aval Sumangalithan is a 1985 Indian Tamil-language drama film directed by Visu. Based on his play of the same name, the film stars Karthik and Ilavarasi. It was released on 19 July 1985. The film was remade in Telugu as Punyasthree (1986).

Plot 

Arumugam, a poor father, seeks a groom for his daughter Uma. For Arumugam, the perfect bridegroom seems to be Bhaskaran. Bhaskaran then marries Uma. Bhaskaran understands his in-laws' financial problems, thus he helps them. He is always shown to be the perfect son rather than a son-in-law always accommodating the weird quirks of Arumugam and his wife. Even the exceptional inter-religious friendship between Bhaskaran and Kuriakose and Nisha, does not seem to cause any trouble either between the orthodox Arumugam and his wife or Uma and her husband. When everything seems to go perfect, fate throws in a wrench. Later, Bhaskaran suffers from a brain tumour and will die soon. Before Uma realises this, she kills herself and Bhaskaran is cured of the tumour.

Cast 
Karthik as Bhaskaran
Ilavarasi as Uma
Visu as Arumugam
K. R. Vijaya as Mangalam
Chandrasekhar as Kuriakose
Nisha Noor as Stella
Master Haja Sheriff as Mani
T. P. Gajendran as Fernandes
Kishmu as a doctor
Kasthuri Raja as compounder

Soundtrack 
The music composed by M. S. Viswanathan, with lyrics written by Pulamaipithan, Muthulingam, N. Kamarasan, Idhayachandran and Jothi Pandian.

Reception 
Jayamanmadhan of Kalki wrote Visu is stunning in the comedy, the compelling knotted story, the gripping characters and the heart-wrenching sadness at the end, all of which are underpinned by his dialogues.

References

External links 

1980s Tamil-language films
1985 drama films
1985 films
Films directed by Visu
Films scored by M. S. Viswanathan
Films with screenplays by Visu
Indian drama films
Indian films based on plays
Tamil films remade in other languages